The monastic site in St Mullin's, County Carlow, Ireland, is an early medieval ecclesiastical site.

History 
St Mullin's is located on the banks of the River Barrow, at the point where its tributary, the River Aughavaud meets it. The monastic site was found by Saint Moling at some point in the 7th century. It was renowned as a place of pilgrimage potentially since the pre-Christian period, when people may have traveled to the site to celebrate Lughnasadh. St Mullin's is traditionally associated with the Book of Mulling. In the early ninth century the monastery was plundered by vikings. In 1158, St Mullin's was granted to Ferns Abbey, part of the Augustinian order. In 1880, the ruins of the monastic site entered state care.

Buildings 
A disused Anglican church is the northernmost building on the grounds, and was built in 1811.

References

Notes

Sources

Further reading 

 

Augustinian monasteries in the Republic of Ireland
Buildings and structures in County Carlow
Religion in County Carlow
Ruins in the Republic of Ireland
National Monuments in County Carlow
Tourist attractions in County Carlow